North Fork Pound Reservoir (also known as North Fork of Pound Lake) is a reservoir in Wise County, Virginia. It was built in 1966 as authorised by the Flood Control Act of 1960 and managed by the United States Army Corps of Engineers.

General
The North Fork of Pound River is a part of the upper reaches of the Big Sandy system. On its way to the Ohio River, the waters from North Fork flow northeast and meet the South Fork River to form the Pound River. The Pound River then flows into the John W. Flannagan Dam which empties into the  Russell Fork River near Haysi, Virginia. The Russell Fork cuts through the Allegheny Mountain range to join the Levisa Fork then meets the Tug Fork at Louisa and forms the Big Sandy River.

History
Construction began in 1966 by the U.S. Army Corps of Engineers under the Flood Control Act of 1960. The rock fill dam was completed in 1963 at a cost of $6.2 million. During the fall the lake elevation is lowered  to hold water from fall and spring runoff. The U.S. Forest Service obtained ownership of the lands surrounding the lake in 1983.

See also
Lakes of Virginia
US Army Corps of Engineers
Pound, Virginia
John W. Flanagan Dam and Reservoir

References

Protected areas of Wise County, Virginia
Reservoirs in Virginia
United States Army Corps of Engineers, Huntington District
Bodies of water of Wise County, Virginia